Retiniphyllum cataractae is a species of flowering plant in the family Rubiaceae. It is endemic to the Amazonas. It was described for the first time by Adolpho Ducke in 1938.

References

External links 
 World Checklist of Rubiaceae

Endemic flora of Brazil
Retiniphylleae
Taxa named by Adolpho Ducke